Kattabomman is a 1993 Tamil-language comedy drama film directed by Manivasagam. The film stars Sarath Kumar and Vineetha. It was released on 13 November 1993 as a Deepavali release .

Plot

The village chairman Kalingarayan and his son Rajappa spread terror among the villagers. Whereas Kattabomman is an angry man who cannot tolerate injustice. He was brought up by his grandfather and his widowed mother. His family and Kalingarayan's family are in a feud for several years. Kattabomman falls in love with Kalingarayan's daughter Priya and he marries her despite their families' wishes. In angry, his grandfather tells their past. What transpires later forms the crux of the story.

Cast

Sarath Kumar as Kattabomman
Vineetha as Priya
Nagesh as Kattabomman's grandfather
Srividya as Devada, Kattabomman's sister-in-law
Goundamani as Subramani
Senthil as Pazhani
Vijayakumar as Ponnurangam, Kattabomman's father
Sakthivel as Kalingarayan
Kavitha as Saroja, Kalingarayan's wife
Uday Prakash as Rajappa
Poonam Dasgupta as Rani
S. N. Lakshmi
Varalakshmi as Kattabomman's mother
Vahini
Prasanna Kumar as Iyer Mama
Vasuki as Azhamu Mami
Krishnamoorthy
Karuppu Subbiah
Tiruppur Ramasamy as Ramasamy 
Jayamani

Soundtrack

The film score and the soundtrack were composed by Deva. The soundtrack, released in 1993, features 5 tracks with lyrics written by Kalidasan.

Reception
Malini Mannath of The Indian Express wrote, "Kattabomman is a fiasco and the only way to enjoy the film is to close one's eyes and ears". Thulasi of Kalki wrote that the director made an engine out of all spare parts, one should wait and see whether it would run in horse power or will fade.

References

1993 films
Films scored by Deva (composer)
1990s Tamil-language films
Films directed by Manivasagam